The men's marathon at the 1978 European Athletics Championships was held in Prague, then Czechoslovakia, on 3 September 1978.

Medalists

Results

Final
3 September

Participation
According to an unofficial count, 49 athletes from 21 countries participated in the event.

 (3)
 (3)
 (3)
 (3)
 (2)
 (2)
 (2)
 (2)
 (2)
 (3)
 (3)
 (3)
 (2)
 (2)
 (1)
 (3)
 (1)
 (2)
 (2)
 (3)
 (2)

References

Marathon
Marathons at the European Athletics Championships
Euro
Men's marathons